Jules Elegbedé (born 12 October 1993) is a Beninese international footballer who plays for Energie, as a striker.

References

1993 births
Living people
Beninese footballers
Benin international footballers
Université Nationale du Bénin FC players
Avrankou Omnisport FC players
Energie FC players
Association football forwards